"Turn Off the Light" is a song by Canadian singer-songwriter Nelly Furtado from her debut studio album, Whoa, Nelly! (2000). Written by Furtado, and produced by Gerald Eaton, Brian West, and Furtado, the song was released as the album's second single on 2 July 2001, reaching number one in New Zealand, Portugal, and Romania, as well peaking within the top 10 in several other countries, including Australia, the United Kingdom, and the United States.

Music video
There are two music videos for "Turn Off the Light": the underground version and the regular version. 

The regular version was directed by Sophie Muller and was filmed in Chinatown's Central Plaza in Los Angeles, California. The music video for the regular version of "Turn Off the Light" begins in a swamp where Furtado is sitting on the edge of a log and people are swimming in the swamp. She begins to sing the first verse and when the chorus commences the people in the swamp pull her in and they start dancing in the swamp. When the second verse begins Furtado is seen at a temple singing while dancers jump out and dance with Furtado. During the second part of the chorus, she is surrounded by a group at the temple and they dance around her while she sings. During the bridge Furtado is shown at an old house singing and playing the guitar, with the flag of the Azores both behind her and on her guitar (this scene is interpolated with shots of a DJ playing, also with the Azorean flag behind him, and topless men dancing while using skirts that resemble those used in Sufi whirling). The video ends with Furtado back at the temple eating noodles. 

The underground video features Furtado playing the guitar in a wooden shed, wearing a white top and jeans. She is also seen buying flowers. Behind the scenes footage of the photoshoot for the Whoa, Nelly! cover is interwoven throughout the video.

Chart performance
The song became Furtado's most successful song at the time of its release. In New Zealand, it became her first number-one single and stayed on the chart for 27 weeks. "Turn Off the Light" was certified Gold by Recorded Music NZ for sales greater than 5,000 copies. The song became the second-most successful song of New Zealand in 2001, behind Craig David's "Walking Away". It peaked at number 5 on the US Billbard Hot 100 on 10 November 2001. A remix featuring rappers Ms. Jade and Timbaland was also released, and a dance remix topped the Billboard Hot Dance Music/Club Play chart. In Australia, although the song peaked at number 7, it remained in the top 50 for 21 weeks and was certified Platinum for sales exceeding 70,000 copies. The song debuted and peaked at number 4 on the UK Singles Chart, becoming Furtado's second top-5 single there, and reached number 2 on the UK R&B Chart.

Track listings

UK CD single
 "Turn Off the Light"
 "Turn Off the Light" (remix featuring Timbaland and Ms. Jade)
 "I'm Like a Bird" (acoustic version)
 "Turn Off the Light" (CD-ROM video)

UK 12-inch single
A1. "Turn Off the Light" (remix featuring Timbaland and Ms. Jade)
A2. "Turn Off the Light" (So Solid Crew remix)
B1. "Turn Off the Light" (album version)
B2. "Turn Off the Light" (Sunshine Reggae mix)

UK cassette single and European CD single
 "Turn Off the Light" (radio edit) – 3:36
 "I'm Like a Bird" (acoustic version) – 3:50

Australasian CD single
 "Turn Off the Light" (radio edit)
 "Turn Off the Light" (Sunshine Reggae mix)
 "I'm Like a Bird" (acoustic)
 "Turn Off the Light" (underground video)

Credits and personnel
Credits are adapted from the Whoa, Nelly! album booklet.

Studios
 Recorded and engineered at The Gymnasium (Toronto, Canada) and Can-Am Recorders (Tarzana, Los Angeles)
 Mixed at Can-Am Recorders (Tarzana, Los Angeles)
 Mastered at Classic Sound (New York City)

Personnel

 Nelly Furtado – writing, lead vocals, background vocals, programming, production
 Gerald Eaton – additional background vocals, programming, production
 James McCollum – swamp guitar
 Brian West – pitched-up guitar, scratching, production, programming, recording, engineering
 Brad Haehnel – mixing, recording, engineering
 John Knupp – second engineering
 Scott Hull – mastering

Charts

Weekly charts

Year-end charts

Certifications

Release history

See also
 List of number-one dance singles of 2001 (U.S.)
 List of Romanian Top 100 number ones of the 2000s

References

2000 songs
2001 singles
DreamWorks Records singles
Music videos directed by Sophie Muller
Nelly Furtado songs
Number-one singles in New Zealand
Number-one singles in Portugal
Number-one singles in Romania
Songs written by Nelly Furtado